Peter Wright (born 8 September 1996) is an Australian rules footballer who plays for the Essendon Football Club in the Australian Football League (AFL), having been initially drafted to the Gold Coast Suns with pick 8 in the 2014 AFL draft.

AFL career

Gold Coast: 2015–2020
Wright established himself as a key marking forward, using his considerable height to his advantage. Wright made his debut in round 10 2015, kicking a goal in a losing effort against . In round 11 2017, Wright kicked the winning goal against  for the Suns first win against the Eagles. After his debut season, Wright became a regular of the team, barely missing a game. In 2018, he suffered a knee injury that required re-hab. Wright played 17 out of a possible 22 games in season 2019, but the emergence of Ben King in 2019 and the return of Zac Smith meant Wright wasn't able to get a game in 2020.

Essendon: 2021–
On 8 Aug 2021, Wright kicked seven goals against the Western Bulldogs in a 13-point win.
 In Round 14 of the 2022 AFL season, Wright starred in their upset win against St Kilda, achieving four goals and 14 disposals.
At the conclusion of the 2022 season , Wright was named Essendon Best and Fairest winning the prestigious Crichton Medal.

Statistics
Statistics are correct to the end of the 2022 season

|- style="background-color: #EAEAEA"
! scope="row" style="text-align:center" | 2015
|  || 30 || 3 || 1 || 1 || 12 || 5 || 17 || 8 || 3 || 0.3 || 0.3 || 4.0 || 1.7 || 5.7 || 2.7 || 1.0
|-
! scope="row" style="text-align:center" | 2016
|  || 30 || 17 || 27 || 10 || 106 || 89 || 195 || 83 || 27 || 1.6 || 0.6 || 6.2 || 5.2 || 11.5 || 4.9 || 1.6
|- style="background-color: #EAEAEA"
! scope="row" style="text-align:center" | 2017
|  || 30 || 22 || 31 || 19 || 159 || 117 || 276 || 121 || 35 || 1.4 || 0.9 || 7.2 || 5.3 || 12.6 || 5.5 || 1.6
|- 
! scope="row" style="text-align:center" | 2018
|  || 30 || 7 || 5 || 4 || 43 || 29 || 72 || 33 || 18 || 0.7 || 0.6 || 6.1 || 4.1 || 10.3 || 4.7 || 2.6
|- style="background-color: #EAEAEA"
! scope="row" style="text-align:center" | 2019
|  || 30 || 17 || 21 || 13 || 144 || 60 || 204 || 85 || 26 || 1.2 || 0.8 || 8.5 || 3.5 || 12.0 || 5.0 || 1.5
|- 
! scope="row" style="text-align:center" | 2020
|  || 30 || - || - || - || - || - || - || - || - || - || - ||-||-||-||-||-
|- style="background-color: #EAEAEA"
! scope="row" style="text-align:center" | 2021
|  || 20 || 21 || 29 || 14 || 146 || 100 || 246 || 90 || 37 || 1.4 || 0.7 || 6.9 || 4.8 || 11.7 || 4.3 || 1.8
|- 
! scope="row" style="text-align:center" | 2022
|  || 20 || 22 || 53 || 26 || 181 || 63 || 244 || 128 || 15 || 2.4 || 1.2 || 8.2 || 2.9 || 11.1 || 5.8 || 0.7
|- style="background-color: #EAEAEA"
|- class="sortbottom"
! colspan=3| Career
! 109
! 167
! 87
! 791
! 463
! 1254
! 547
! 161
! 1.5
! 0.8
! 7.3
! 4.2
! 11.5
! 5.0
! 1.5
|}

References

External links

1996 births
Living people
Gold Coast Football Club players
Essendon Football Club players
Calder Cannons players
Australian rules footballers from Victoria (Australia)